National Medical Library is a medical library established on 1 April 1966 by the Government of India. It is located in Ansari Nagar, New Delhi.

It aims to provide library and information services to the health science professionals in India. It functions under the administrative control of the Directorate General of Health Services.

It has 3.6 lakh volumes of books, reports, bound volume of journals and other literature. It subscribes around 2000 periodicals annually. The library has good collection of 19th century literature. Books are classified according to the Dewey Decimal Classification. It became the Indian focal point of HELLIS Network under World Health Organization in 1982.

It has been organizing training programmes for medical/health science librarians since 1980. It has organized 17 Orientation Courses in Health Science Librarianship and trained over 150 librarians in India. It has also conducted training courses on specific topics like MEDLARS Searching, Computer Applications, Library management Software, Indexing and Abstracting etc. in different regions. National Workshop was held in 1997 to evaluate these courses.

Any qualified medical person, student or faculty can take membership of the library and utilize the services of this vast amount of information in the library. One can also obtain a photocopy of any article by post, by paying a nominal fee.

External links
 Official website of National Medical Library

Medical libraries
Libraries in Delhi
Medical education in India
India
Libraries established in 1966